Imamzadeh Seyed Morteza is related to the Qajar dynasty and is located in Razavi Khorasan Province, Kashmar. Massive trees, waterfalls and swimming pools add to the attractions of this place, and on the other hand, a good number of living rooms provide a good base for traveling to this place, as well as the many shops and dining halls.

See also 

 Cultural Heritage, Handicrafts and Tourism Organization of Iran

Sources

Mosques in Iran
Buildings and structures in Kashmar
National works of Iran
Tourist attractions in Razavi Khorasan Province